Al-Shahba University (SU), is a private university in Syria, established in 2005. It is located in the southern suburbs of the city of Aleppo. It was known as the Gulf University until February 2012 when the name was changed to al-Shahba University.

Al-Shahba University is under academic cooperation agreements with the George Mason University and Bentley University.

Faculties
Engineering and technology
Management
Dentistry

References

Shahba University
Shahba University
Shahba University
2005 establishments in Syria